The Diocese of Trincomalee is a Roman Catholic diocese for eastern Sri Lanka. The current bishop is Noel Emmanuel.

History
The Diocese of Trincomalee was created on 25 August 1893 from parts of the Archdiocese of Colombo and the Diocese of Jaffna.  In the Eastern Province of Sri lanka there were two abandon regions.According to the report of Rev.FR Etinne  Sameria ( omi), in 1850, in Trincomalee there were five churches with 1500 Catholics. Every Sunday Sermon delivered in English and Tamil     

The diocese was renamed Diocese of Trincomalee–Batticaloa on 23 October 1967. On 19 December 1975 parts of the diocese were transferred to newly created Apostolic Prefecture of Anuradhapura. The diocese was renamed Diocese of Trincomalee on 3 July 2012 after parts of the diocese were transferred to newly created Diocese of Batticaloa.

Bishops

References

 
Organisations based in Eastern Province, Sri Lanka
Religious organizations established in 1893
Trincomalee-Batticaloa